{|

{{Infobox ship career
|Hide header         =
|Ship country        = France
|Ship flag           = 
|Ship name           = 
 Mariette
 Kebyar
 Janeen
 Gee Gee IV
 Cleopatra's Barge II'
 Le Voyageur Guinevere Evening Star Mariette|Ship namesake       =
|Ship ordered        =
|Ship builder        = Herreshoff,  Bristol
|Ship laid down      = 
|Ship launched       = 1916
|Ship acquired       =
|Ship commissioned   =
|Ship decommissioned =
|Ship in service     =
|Ship out of service =
|Ship captured       =
|Ship struck         =
|Ship reinstated     =
|Ship fate           = 
|Ship status         = In service
|Ship honours=
|Ship notes=
}}

|}Mariette is a classic two-masted gaff schooner, designed and built by Nathanael Greene Herreshoff in 1915 for Harold S. Vanderbilt. She now sails out of Antibes, France, under the French flag.

 Design Mariette was built as "Project 698" by Nathanael Herreshoff, at his Bristol, Rhode Island yard, for prominent yachtsman Harold S. Vanderbilt. She was part of a series of seven large schooners built between 1903 and 1905 by the Herreshoff shipyard. Mariette and her sister-ship Vagrant are the last of this series still in service. The ships are smaller versions of the earlier Eleonora and Westward, also by Herreshoff.

 History 
Skipper Jacob F. Brown sailed on Mariette until 1927. She was then sold to Francis B. Crowninshield, from a family with a sailing tradition, whose first ship was Cleopatra’s Barge. In homage to this ship, they renamed Mariette to Cleopatra’s Barge II. The rigging was modified into a Bermuda rig. Writer James A. Michener was a regular guest aboard, and mentions the ship in his novel Chesapeake (1978).

In 1939, Mariette was requisitioned for service with the US Coast Guard and used for patrols. Crowninshield was given his ship back in 1946, in a state of disrepair, and sold her.

In the following years, Mariette had several owners and various names. At some point, she was owned by Walter Boudreau under the name Janeen. From 1979 to 1990, she belonged to Andrea Rizzoli, who had her restored at the Beconcini shipyard (Cantieri Navali Beconcini) in La Spezia, Italy. In 1982, she was used as a charter in the Caribbean. In 1995, Thomas J. Perkins, from San Francisco, purchased her and restored her original rigging. The same year, Mariette collided with the 6-metre Taos Brett IV during the Nioulargue race, killing one of the sailors.

He sailed in various Mediterranean races until 2005. He then sold Mariette'' to a French skipper, base in Antibes.

Notes and references 
 References

 External links 
 Mariette - Site classic yacht info
 MARIETTE - Site voilier à 2 mâts
 Mariette of 1915 yacht NOT for charter*
 Mariette of 1915
 Mariette
  Living legend: Inside the major refit of Herreshoff schooner Mariette of 1915

Ships built in Bristol, Rhode Island
1916 ships
Ships of France
Schooners
Ship names